The 1968-69 season was Chelsea Football Club's 55th of competitive football, and their 42nd in the English top flight.

Results

First Division

FA Cup

League Cup

Fairs Cup

References

Soccerbase
Hockings, Ron. 100 Years of the Blues: A Statistical History of Chelsea Football Club. (2007)

Chelsea F.C. seasons
Chelsea